Uther was a legendary king of sub-Roman Britain and the father of King Arthur.

Uther may also refer to:

People
 Johan Baptista van Uther (died 1597), Dutch painter active in Sweden
 Reuben Uther (1791–1880), Australian merchant and manufacturer
 Hans-Jörg Uther (born 1944), German literary scholar and 2010 winner of the Brothers Grimm Prize of the University of Marburg
 Uther Moukimou (born 1992), Congolese basketball player in an AfroBasket 2009 squad

Fictional entities 

 Lord Uther, a character in Fire Emblem

Other uses
 , a British submarine
 "Uther", a 1994 song by Poster Children from Just like You
 Uther, a 2001 novel by Jack Whyte
 Uther, an alien on Natural History of an Alien